Circuit's Edge is a video game developed by Westwood Associates and released by Infocom in 1990. It is based on George Alec Effinger's 1987 novel When Gravity Fails. The game is a hybrid interactive fiction/role-playing video game; it contains a window of text, a graphic window for depiction of the player's current location, and various menus and mini-windows for character statistics and other game functions.

Plot
The player assumes the role of Marîd Audran, a private detective. The game is set in "The Budayeen", an entertainment/criminal quarter in an unnamed city somewhere in the Middle East that is based on New Orleans. While running a series of errands/"business deals" for "Saied the Half-Hajj", a friend of Marîd's, Marîd is framed for the murder of a man named Kenji Carter. Although Marîd's influential patron Friedlander Bey clears him with the local police, Bey asks him to look into Carter's death. Doing so leads Marîd deep into the criminal underworld of the Budayeen.

Effinger's novel When Gravity Fails was the first in a series of three "Marîd Audran" books (followed by 1989's A Fire in the Sun and 1991's The Exile Kiss); Circuit's Edge takes place between the first and second novel.

Reception
The editors of Game Player's PC Strategy Guide presented the game with their 1990 "Best PC Graphic Adventure Game" award. They wrote, "An intelligent, literate, and thoroughly compelling sci-fi role-playing game, Circuit's Edge is the best cyberpunk game yet released."

Reviews
White Wolf #22 (Aug./Sept., 1990)

References

External links

 Stay Forever: Circuit’s Edge: A conversation with Michael Legg (Transcription of an Interview for the Stay Forever-podcast on Friday, March 6th 2020)

1990 video games
DOS games
DOS-only games
Infocom games
Detective video games
Cyberpunk video games
Video games based on novels
Video games developed in the United States
Video games set in the Middle East
Video games set in Morocco
Westwood Studios games
Single-player video games